African Americans in Oklahoma or Black Oklahomans are residents of the state of Oklahoma who are of African American ancestry. African Americans have a rich history in Oklahoma. An estimated 7.8% of Oklahomans are Black.

African-Americans first settled in Oklahoma during the Trail of Tears. While many of these people were African slaves, around 500 chose to do so in order to escape slavery.

Racism against Blacks has been common throughout the state's history, manifesting itself in scenarios such as the Tulsa race massacre, which targeted members of Tulsa's affluent African-American Greenwood District.

All-black towns 
Entirely black towns and neighbourhoods were historically common in Oklahoma, and thirteen still exist. This is a list of all remaining African American towns in Oklahoma:

 Brooksville
 Boley
 Clearview
 Grayson
 IXL
 Langston
 Lima
 Redbird
 Rentiesville
 Summit
 Taft

 Tatums
 Tullahassee

 Vernon

Notable residents 

 Green Currin, first African American to serve in the Oklahoma Territorial Legislature
 Lelia Foley, first Black female mayor in the United States
 A. C. Hamlin, first African American in the Oklahoman legislature
 Edward P. McCabe, politician

See also 

 Choctaw freedmen
List of African-American newspapers in Oklahoma
Demographics of Oklahoma
History of slavery in Oklahoma

References

African-American history of Oklahoma